The Taiwan Strait is a -wide strait separating the island of Taiwan and continental Asia. The strait is part of the South China Sea and connects to the East China Sea to the north.

The Taiwan Strait is itself a subject of an international dispute over its political status. As the People's Republic of China claims to enjoy "sovereignty, sovereign rights and jurisdiction over the Taiwan Strait" and regards the waterway as "internal territorial waters" instead of being international waters, this means that the Chinese government denies any foreign vessel having the freedom of navigation in the strait. This position has drawn strong objections from the United States, Australia, France and Taiwan.

Names

Geography 

The Taiwan Strait is the body of water separating Fujian Province from Taiwan Island. The international agreement does not define the Taiwan Strait but places its waters within the South China Sea, whose northern limit runs from Cape Fugui (the northernmost point on Taiwan Island; Fukikaku) to Niushan Island to the southernmost point of Pingtan Island and thence westward along the parallel  N. to the coast of Fujian Province.  The draft for a new edition of the IHO's Limits of Oceans and Seas does precisely define the Taiwan Strait, classifying it as part of the North Pacific Ocean. It makes the Taiwan Strait a body of water between the East and South China Seas and delimits it:

The entire strait is on Asia's continental shelf. As such, there are many islands in the strait. The largest and most important islands off the coast of Fujianese are Xiamen, Gulangyu, Pingtan (the "Haitan" of the IHO delineation), Kinmen, and Matsu. The first three are controlled by the  People's Republic of China (PRC); the last two by the Republic Of China (ROC). Within the strait lie the Penghu or the Pescadores, also controlled by the ROC.

All of Fujian Province's rivers except the Ting run into the Taiwan Strait. The largest two are the Min and the Jiulong.

Median line
Historically both the People's Republic of China (PRC) and the Republic of China (ROC) on Taiwan espoused a One-China Policy that considered the strait part of the exclusive economic zone of a single "China". In practice, a maritime border of control exists along the median line down the strait. The median line was defined in 1955 by US Air Force General Benjamin O. Davis Jr. who drew a line down the middle of the strait, the US then pressured both sides into entering into a tacit agreement not to cross the median line. The PRC did not cross the median line until 1999; however, following the first encroachment in 1999, Chinese aircraft have encroached over the median line with increasing regularity. The median line is also known as the Davis line.

Geology

Sediment distribution 
Each year, Taiwan's rivers carry up to 370 million tons of sediments into the sea, including 60 to 150 million tons deposited into the Taiwan Strait. During the past ten thousand years, 600 billion tons of riverine sediments have been deposited in the Taiwan Strait, locally forming a lobe up to 40 m thick in the southern part of the Taiwan Strait.

History 

The Strait mostly separated the Han culture of the Chinese mainland from Taiwan Island's aborigines for millennia, although the Hakka and Hoklo traded and migrated across it.  European explorers, principally the Spanish and Dutch, also took advantage of the strait to establish forward bases for trade with the mainland during the Ming; the bases were also used for raiding both the Chinese coast and the trading ships of rival countries.

Widespread Chinese migration across the strait began in the late Ming. During the Qing conquest, Zheng Chenggong (Koxinga) expelled the Dutch and established the Kingdom of Tungning in 1661, planning to launch a reconquest of the mainland in the name of the Southern Ming branches of the old imperial dynasty. Dorgon and the Kangxi Emperor were able to consolidate their control over southern mainland China; Koxinga found himself limited to raiding across the strait. His grandson Zheng Keshuang surrendered to the Qing after his admiral lost the 1683 Battle of the Penghu Islands in the middle of the strait.

Japan seized the Penghu Islands during the First Sino-Japanese War and gained control of Taiwan at its conclusion in 1895. Control of the eastern half of the strait was used to establish control of the southern Chinese coast during the Second World War. The strait protected Japanese bases and industry in Taiwan from Chinese attack and sabotage, but aerial warfare reached the island by 1943. The 1944 Formosa Air Battle gave the United States Pacific Fleet air supremacy from its carrier groups and Philippine bases; subsequently, the bombing was continuous until Japan's surrender in 1945.  The rapid advance of the Communist PLA in 1949 provoked the government's retreat across the Taiwan Strait. On 26 February 2022, China denounced the sailing of the U.S. Navy's 7th Fleet Arleigh Burke-class guided-missile destroyer USS Ralph Johnson through the Taiwan Strait as a 'provocative act'." One 25 May 2002, China Airlines Flight 611 broke up in mid-air and crashed into the Taiwan Strait, killing all 225 people on board.

Economy 

Fishermen have used the strait as a fishing resource since time immemorial. In the modern world, it is the gateway used by ships of almost every kind on passage to and from nearly all the important ports in Northeast Asia. In 2020 Chinese vessels had been illegally fishing and dredging sand on the Taiwanese half of the strait.

Taiwan is building major wind farms in the strait.

Gallery

See also

References

Citations

Bibliography

 .
 .
 .

 
Straits of Asia
Straits of the Pacific Ocean
International straits
Straits of Taiwan
Straits of China
East China Sea
Straits of the South China Sea
Bodies of water of Fujian